Yazgan is a surname. Notable people with the surname include:

Bestâmi Yazgan (born 1957), Turkish composer
Ercan Yazgan (born 1946), Turkish comedian and political satirist
Mehmet Emin Yazgan (1876–1961), Ottoman Army officer
Orkun Yazgan (born 1970), Turkish TV presenter and musician